DePaul Catholic High School is a private, Roman Catholic, high school in Wayne, in Passaic County, New Jersey, United States, that operates under the auspices of the Roman Catholic Diocese of Paterson. The school is accredited by AdvancED.

As of the 2019–20 school year, the school had an enrollment of 461 students and 44.6 classroom teachers (on an FTE basis), for a student–teacher ratio of 10.3:1. The school's student body was 61.0% (281) White, 16.5% (76) Asian, 12.6% (58) Black and 10% (46) Hispanic.

History
DePaul Catholic was established in 1956.

Academics 
The program of studies offered at DePaul Catholic High School seeks to equip college-bound students with a foundation for the pursuit of academic excellence while emphasizing a curriculum tailored for individual differences. Students learn to apply their knowledge and training toward their ongoing development of the Whole Person.

DePaul Catholic is a college preparatory high school offering advanced placement, honors, college prep, and foundations levels of study. In the Class of 2015, 98% of graduates are attending colleges and universities. Graduates in the Class of 2015 were awarded over $10.5 million in academic merit-based scholarships, and 99% of the graduates have gone on to colleges, universities, and technical schools.

All students and faculty use Tablet PC laptop computer/notebooks connected using a wireless Internet system.

Athletics 
The DePaul Spartans competes in the Big North Conference, which is comprised of public and private high schools in Bergen and Passaic counties, and was established following a reorganization of sports leagues in Northern New Jersey by the New Jersey State Interscholastic Athletic Association. Before the NJSIAA's 2010 realignment, the school had competed in the Northern Hills Conference an athletic conference comprised of public and private high schools located in Essex, Morris and Passaic counties. With 381 students in grades 10-12, the school was classified by the NJSIAA for the 2019–20 school year as Non-Public A for most athletic competition purposes, which included schools with an enrollment of 381 to 1,454 students in that grade range (and the equivalent of Group I for public schools). The football team competes in the United White division of the North Jersey Super Football Conference, which includes 112 schools competing in 20 divisions, making it the nation's biggest football-only high school sports league. The school was classified by the NJSIAA as Non-Public Group III for football for 2018–2020.

There are over 20 varsity sports for boys and girls in the school. The athletic director is Joe Lennon. The mascot is the Spartan and the colors are green and white. The sports teams that are available include: Boys - baseball, basketball, bowling, cross country, football, golf, ice hockey, lacrosse, skiing, soccer, swimming, track and field, winter track, volleyball, wrestling; Girls - basketball, bowling, cheerleading (football), cross country, golf, lacrosse, soccer, softball, skiing, swimming, track and field, volleyball, dance team, winter track. 23 varsity teams for boys and girls and 30 extracurricular activities are offered.

The school participates as the host school / lead agency for a joint cooperative skiing team with Morris Catholic High School. The co-op program operates under agreements scheduled to expire at the end of the 2023–24 school year.

The football team was awarded the sectional championship by the New Jersey State Interscholastic Athletic Association in 1962 and 1972 (as co-champion). Since the playoff system was introduced in 1974, the team has won the Non-Public A North sectional title in 1975, the Non-Public B North state sectional championship in 1992, won the Non-Public II state title in 2013-2015, and won the Non-Public III title in 2017 and 2019. The 1975 team finished the season with a 9-2 record by winning the Parochial A North sectional title after a 7-7 tie in regulation with Bergen Catholic High School was settled in overtime under a system in which each team ran four plays and the winner was the team that gained the most yardage; DePaul was declared the winner based on a margin of 16 yards gained. The 1992 team won the Parochial B North title with a 28-21 win against six-time defending champion Pope John XXIII Regional High School, which came into the playoff finals unbeaten in its previous 24 games. The 2013 team finished the season with a record of 10-2 after winning the Non-Public Group II state title with a 35-16 victory against a Holy Spirit High School team that came undefeated into the championship game played at Rutgers University. In 2017, facing a third-seeded Saint Joseph Regional High School team that had won the previous 13 games between the two teams, top-seeded DePaul won the Non-Public Group III state sectional championship by a score of 7–3 in the tournament title game played at Kean University's Alumni Stadium. The team won the Non-Public Group III in 2019, the program's fifth title in a seven-year span, with a 27-25 win in the finals against Mater Dei High School.

The boys' cross country team won the Non Public B state championship in 1966.

The field hockey team won the Parochial A North state sectional title in 1982, and went on to win the Parochial A state championship that year, defeating Holy Spirit High School by a score of 2-1 in the title game.

The softball team won the Non-Public A state championship in 1984 (defeating Camden Catholic High School in the tournament final) and won the Non-Public B title in 1985 and 1993 (vs. Bishop Eustace Preparatory School both years).

The boys spring / outdoor track and field team won the Non-Public B state championship in 1989 and 2004. The 1989 team won the Parochial B state title by 60 to 37 ahead of second-place finisher and returning champion Immaculate Conception High School of Montclair.

The wrestling team won the Parochial A North state sectional title in 1980 and won the Non-Public B North sectional title in 1993 and 2010-2014. The team won the Parochial B state championship in 1993 and the Non-Public B state title in 2014.

Stand Tall
85% of students and staff are members of "Stand Tall", DePaul's voluntary drug prevention program, which offers voluntary and school-sponsored, drug testing for students and staff.

Notable alumni

 Michael Dwumfour (born 1998), American football defensive tackle for the Cleveland Browns
 Ronnie Hickman, American football safety who played college football at Ohio State
 Eric Klenofsky (born 1994), soccer player who currently plays for Richmond Kickers of the United Soccer League on loan from D.C. United of Major League Soccer.
 Alyssa Oviedo (born 2000), footballer who plays as a midfielder for the Dominican Republic national team
 Jazlyn Oviedo (born 2002), footballer who plays as a midfielder for the Dominican Republic women's national team.
 Andre Sayegh (born 1973/1974, class of 1992), politician who has served since 2018 as the Mayor of Paterson
 Kareem Walker (born 1998), running back who is playing for the St. Louis Battlehawks of the XFL.

References

External links 
School Website
Data for DePaul Catholic High School, National Center for Education Statistics

1956 establishments in New Jersey
Educational institutions established in 1956
Middle States Commission on Secondary Schools
Private high schools in Passaic County, New Jersey
Roman Catholic Diocese of Paterson
Catholic secondary schools in New Jersey
Wayne, New Jersey